Ray Keldie (born 17 January 1946) is a former tennis player from Australia. He competed in the Australian Open 8 times, the French Open 4 times, Italian Open 4 times, Wimbledon 9 times, US Open 7 times, Queens Club 4 times from 1965 to 1975.

Grand Slam finals

Doubles:  (1 runner-up)

References 

1946 births
Living people
Australian male tennis players
Place of birth missing (living people)